BDD or bdd may refer to:

Science and technology
 Body dysmorphic disorder, a mental disorder involving a disturbed body image
 Brachydactyly type D, relative shortness and roundness of the thumb with an accompanying wide nail bed 
 Boron-doped diamond, Synthetic diamond containing some boron.

Computing
 Balancing domain decomposition, a parallel iterative method in numerical analysis
 Behavior-driven development, a software development technique
 Binary decision diagram, a data structure in computer science
 Business Desktop Deployment, project management tools published by Microsoft
 Business-driven development, a software development methodology focusing on business requirements

Organisations
 Bantam Doubleday Dell, a book publisher that became part of Random House
 Bund der Deutschen, a German political party of the 1950s and 1960s

Places
 Badu Island Airport, Queensland, Australia (by IATA code)
 Baoding East railway station, Hebei, China (by CR code)
 Beirut Digital District, Lebanon

Other uses
 Bdd (born 1999), South Korean professional League of Legends player
 "B.D.D.", a 1969 single by The Groundhogs
 ISO 639:bdd, the Bunama language spoken in Papua New Guinea

See also